José Fernández (born 26 July 1968 in Sydney) is an Australian racing driver. He competed for Britek Motorsport in V8 Supercars during the 2006 season. Fernández still operates his own racing team, mostly in minor GT championships racing Porsches.

Career results

Bathurst 1000 results

References

External links
Profile at Driver Database

Australian racing drivers
1968 births
Living people
Dick Johnson Racing drivers
Supercars Championship drivers